Dylan Vanwelkenhuysen (born 20 January 1992 in Belgium) is a Belgian footballer who plays for K.V.K. Tienen-Hageland and works for Nike in his home country.

Career

Vanwelkenhuysen started his senior career with Sint-Truidense V.V. in 2011. In 2011, he signed for their senior team in the Belgian First Division A,  where he made sixteen appearances and scored zero goals. After that, he played for Belgian clubs AS Verbroedering Geel, Bocholter VV, and K.V. Woluwe-Zaventem, and Armenian club Alashkert, and Belgian clubs K.V.V. Thes Sport Tessenderlo, KVK Wellen and K.V.K. Tienen-Hageland, where he now plays.

References

External links 
 Dagboek - Belgische spits in Armenië 
 “Mijn seizoen begint nu” 
 ‘Veel te danken aan O’Loughlin’ 
 ‘Dit project spreekt me wel aan’ 
 Het Nieuwsblad Tag
 Vanwelkenhuysen spiegelt zich aan Bertjens 

1992 births
Living people
Belgian footballers
Association football forwards
Belgian expatriate footballers
Expatriate footballers in Armenia
Belgian expatriate sportspeople in Armenia
FC Alashkert players
Sint-Truidense V.V. players
AS Verbroedering Geel players
K.V. Woluwe-Zaventem players
K.V.K. Tienen-Hageland players